Breast hemicircumference, or breast circumference, is an anthropometric measure of the breasts which has been used in studies to assess breast development and breast size, including in transgender women. It is the medial horizontal length (measured with a flexible tape measure) from one side of the breast to the other side and running over the nipple.

References

Anthropometry
Breast